Bjørn Stiler (24 July 1911 – 30 March 1996) was a Danish cyclist. He competed in the tandem event at the 1936 Summer Olympics.

References

External links
 

1911 births
1996 deaths
Danish male cyclists
Olympic cyclists of Denmark
Cyclists at the 1936 Summer Olympics
Cyclists from Copenhagen